Ainley Peak is a prominent peak,  high, located  southwest of Post Office Hill in east Ross Island. Named after David G. Ainley, Point Reyes Bird Observatory, Stinson Beach, California, a United States Antarctic Program ornithologist who studied penguin and skua populations at Cape Crozier and McMurdo Sound in six seasons, 1969–70 to 1983–84.

References

Mountains of Ross Island